NASW can mean:

 National Association of Social Workers
 National Association of Science Writers